William Newby may refer to:

 William Newby (Cambridgeshire cricketer) (1836–1932), English cricketer
 William Newby (South African cricketer) (1855–1921), South African cricketer